Chasing Nashville is an American reality television series that aired on Lifetime beginning on October 22, 2013, to November 12, 2013. Set in Appalachia, Kentucky, Chasing Nashville chronicles the lives of several girls who are in the pursuit of fame and fortune in country music industry. The series was canceled after four episodes with the remaining episodes uploaded to the series' official website.

Cast
 Autumn Blair
 Helena Hunt
 Lauren Marie Presley
 Savannah Little
 Celeste Turner
 Julia Knight
 Tyra Short

References

2010s American reality television series
2013 American television series debuts
2013 American television series endings
English-language television shows
Television shows set in Tennessee
Lifetime (TV network) original programming
Women in Kentucky
Women in Tennessee